Kapwani Kiwanga (born 1978) is a Canadian artist working in Paris, France. In 2018, she was named the inaugural winner of the Frieze Artist Award.

Early life and education
Kiwanga was born in 1978 in Hamilton, Ontario, Canada, and grew up there and in the nearby town of Brantford, where she took classes at the Glenhyrst Art Gallery of Brant. She has said that she gained her perspective on colonialism and Canada's Indigenous people from her time in Brantford, which is situated on the Haldimand Tract in the traditional territories of the Anishinaabe and Haudenosaunee peoples. Kiwanga later studied anthropology at McGill University in Montreal, and art at the "La Seine" program at the Ecole Nationale Supérieure des Beaux-Arts in Paris.  Kiwanga’s education is not removed from her artistic practice that is intensely research-based, and for which she often embodies the guise of a scientist, anthropologist and/or archivist in performative “happenings” that are also an integral aspect of her overall work in sculpture, painting, video and mixed media installations.

Work
Kiwanga's work is shaped by her academic background in anthropology and comparative religion, and often involves multiple formats and media in order to make possible a diversity of experiences for the viewer. Kiwanga explores the social and political aspects of the world using a multi-perspectival view, formed through growing up in Canada, having family that she visited in Tanzania, and spending the last ten years of her life in France. She employs strategies of social scientific research and documentary modes of presentation in her work. In her Afrogalactica trilogy project (commenced 2011), Kiwanga plays the role of an anthropologist from the future whose research draws upon Afrofuturism, African astronomy and gender. In 'Safe Passage', Kiwanga goes through the history of blackness in America, from slavery to contemporary time and the effect of technology on issues like visibility. It is a sculptural work that is researched-driven and based in Kiwanga's anthropological roots.

Since 2010, Kapwani Kiwanga received increasingly widespread critical attention for her interdisciplinary approach to art-making that prods the realms of history, psychology, and the social and well as "pure " sciences. Her work offers nuanced and subversive insight into what comes to constitute knowledge, truth and authority, both historically and in the present, especially in matters related to the administration of bodies, cultural identity and behavior. In an ongoing project entitled Flowers For Africa the artist mined archives related to African de-colonization to compile a list of flowers associated with individuals, nations and/or resistance movements; an image library that became the basis for meticulous sculptural recreations of individual flowers, or entire bouquets. As Kapwani described of the series, in a statement that reads as apt in relation to her overall approach: “What I’m trying to do is to acquaint myself with these various historic times, and questions, and more generally an interest I have in power dynamics. With this project I have chosen to look from the African continent at these global questions of power dynamics. This project is a way for me to acquaint myself with different archives, consulting documents and simply pondering on those moments. In this process, this was the most natural gesture which emerged". Kiwanga has performed at over 50 institutions and festivals internationally since 2011, a sampling of which would include Afrogalactica: A Brief History of the Future at La Villa Arson, Nice (2012); Afrogalactica: A Brief History of the Future – A Thousand Years of Nonlinear History, Centre Pompidou, Paris (2013); A Conservator's Tale, Jeu de Paume, Paris (2014); Museum of the Blind, Ethnological Museum of Berlin (2014); Afrogalactica: A Brief History of the Future – Across the Board, Tate Project in Lagos, Nigeria (2014); A Spell to Bound the Limitless, FIAC in progress, Grand Palais, Paris (2015); Afrogalactica: A Brief History of the Future, Documenta 14, Athens (2017); Afrogalactica : A Brief History of the Future, Momentum Nordic Biennial of Contemporary Art, Sweden (2017); and Afrogalactica : A Brief History of the Future, Illingworth Kerr Gallery, Calgary (2018).

Major exhibitions
Solo exhibitions of Kiwanga's work have been held at the Centre Georges Pompidou, CCA Glasgow, the Irish Museum of Modern Art, the Bienal Internacional de Arte Contemporáneo in Almeria, Spain, Salt Beyoglu in Istanbul, the South London Gallery, the Jeu de Paume, the Kassel Documentary Film and Video Festival, Paris Photo, and The Power Plant. Kiwanga was the 2016 Commissioned Artist at the Armory Show. In January–March 2018, the Glenhyrst Art Gallery of Brant held a solo exhibition of her work entitled Kapwani Kiwanga: Clearing. In February–May 2018, the Esker Foundation put on A wall is just a wall (and nothing more at all). From 8 February 2019 to 21 April 2019, Kiwanga was exhibited at the MIT List Visual Arts Center in a solo show titled Safe Passage. An exhibition at the New Museum in New York from June 30 through October 16, 2022 examined the social history of light as a form of surveillance.

Awards
Kiwanga has received two BAFTA nominations for her film and video works. In 2018 she was named the inaugural winner of the Frieze Artist Award, and won the Sobey Art Award later that year. In 2020, she won the Marcel Duchamp Prize.

References

1978 births
Living people
Canadian contemporary artists
Canadian multimedia artists
McGill University alumni
Black Canadian women
Artists from Hamilton, Ontario
21st-century Canadian women artists